SafeTV (also known as Safe Television and SafeTV Channel) is a television network based in Springdale, Arkansas. SafeTV was founded by Carlos Pardeiro in 1995, and is owned and operated by Total Life Community Educational Foundation.

SafeTV was broadcast nationally in the USA by IPTV provider Sky Angel.

SafeTV broadcast over-the-air locally in Springdale, Arkansas, on channel 57 as KSBN-TV until March 2007 when channel 57 was sold to Daystar Television Network and changed its callsign to KWOG.

See also
 KWOG

References

External links
 Official site

Three Angels Broadcasting Network
Television networks in the United States
Christian mass media companies
Christian television networks
Religious television stations in the United States
Former Seventh-day Adventist institutions
Television channels and stations established in 1995
Springdale, Arkansas